William David Richardson FRS FLS (born 18 August 1951) has been Director of the UCL Wolfson Institute since 2012.

He was educated at the Royal Belfast Academical Institution, the University of Manchester (BSc Physics, 1973) and King's College London (PhD, 1978). He was a Lecturer in Molecular Genetics at University College London from 1985 to 1990 and has been Professor of Biology at the UCL Wolfson Institute since 1993.

He was made a Fellow of the Royal Society in 2013. He is also a Fellow of the Linnean Society of London.

References

1951 births
Living people
People educated at the Royal Belfast Academical Institution
Alumni of the University of Manchester
Alumni of King's College London
Academics of University College London
Fellows of the Royal Society
Fellows of the Linnean Society of London
Fellows of the Academy of Medical Sciences (United Kingdom)